The men's 100 kg judo competition at the 2020 Summer Paralympics was held on 29 August 2021 at the Nippon Budokan.

Results

Bracket

Repechage

References

External links
 
 Draw Sheet 

M100
Judo at the Summer Paralympics Men's Half Heavyweight